Oxted railway station is on the Oxted line in southern England, serving the commuter town of Oxted, Surrey. The station is managed by Southern who operate the majority of train services with a few peak services operated by Thameslink.

A relatively busy interchange station and terminus, rail services are operated by Southern and Thameslink. The station is the busiest suburban station on the line and is a terminus for some services on the Uckfield branch of the Oxted Line. Trains depart to London Victoria via Clapham Junction, London Bridge via East Croydon station, East Grinstead and Uckfield in East Sussex.

History

Oxted was built as a joint London, Brighton and South Coast Railway/South Eastern Railway station when the South Croydon to East Grinstead line opened on 10 March 1884. The three platforms are connected by a subway which runs under the track. In addition, a lift is provided for entry to Platforms 2/3. There are tunnels at each end of the station:
Oxted Tunnel 1 mile 23 chains (2.07 km) at the London end
Limpsfield Tunnel 551 yard (501 m) at the country end

In 1951 the station had a train every thirteen minutes of the day, services running to Victoria and London Bridge in the up direction and to Tunbridge Wells, Eastbourne and Brighton in the down. Locomotives using the station on an average weekday would be of the following classes: BR4 2-6-4T (14), C2X 0-6-0 (2), H 0-4-4T (12), L 4-4-0 (1), LM2 2-6-2T (5), LM4 2-6-4T (38), N 2-6-0 (2), Q 0-6-0 (8), U 2-6-0 (1) and U1 2-6-0 (2). In addition, diesel 10800 was a regular visitor to the station four times a day between 1952 and 1954.

The station was the scene of a bomb attempt by suffragette sympathisers in 1913 – Harold Laski (later a professor at the London School of Economics and chairman of the Labour Party) and a friend placed the device in the men's toilets. Although it did detonate the damage was limited as the fuse failed to ignite the petrol contained in the device. A similar device (containing some pieces of metal and a watch in addition to the explosive charge) was planted at the Bank of England on 13 April 1913, which was successfully defused.

Facilities
On the London-bound platform is a staffed ticket office (open daily until late) and two standard quick-pay self-service passenger-operated ticket machines in Southern branding are located outside the station on the London-bound side and at the entrance to the underpass on Platforms 2 and 3 side (Uckfield/East Grinstead bound.) The station is staffed 17 hours a day. The station accommodates a café, refurbished toilets, two waiting rooms and a line control centre in a large concourse.

All of the platforms are linked by a subway which also links the two main streets in Oxted together as well as the local supermarket and the town's leisure complex.

There is an underground car park located under the adjacent supermarket.

The station acts as a terminus for the Uckfield branch of the Oxted Line and trains use platform three on a regular basis after termination for both train maintenance and cleaning. The present signal box opened in the 1980s and covered control of the Uckfield line in January 1990. It replaced the previous original wooden structure located at the end of platform 2/3

The station was also the first station and terminus on the Southern network to receive two fully DDA-compliant ticket windows which will move down to accommodate easy use by wheelchair users. The station is also linked to the Southern Control Centre in Croydon, by two help points (one on each platform) where passengers can receive help 24 hours a day externally.

Layout 
Platform 1 is used by northbound trains towards East Croydon and London Victoria, London Bridge and London Blackfriars. It is also used for services from Uckfield, which terminate here before performing an empty shunt movement to platform 3.

Platform 2 is used by most southbound trains towards East Grinstead and Uckfield. Rarely, it can also be used in periods of engineering work to reverse trains from London to reverse if the line is closed south of Oxted, using the crossover to the north of the station.

Platform 3 is a south-facing bay platform and is only used for Sunday services to Uckfield. It can only take 2-car trains.

Improvements
In 2010 the station was refurbished a new lift installed, followed by a deep clean and internal rezoning.

In May 2010, Platform 1 and 2 were lengthened by Balfour Beatty to take 12 car trains.

During January 2011, Southern installed ticket gates on the main concourse as well as the exit and indoor area in between platforms 2 and 3. Gate-line staff operate at the station also.

Services
Off-peak, all services at Oxted are operated by Southern using  DMUs and  EMUs.

The typical off-peak service in trains per hour is:
 1 tph to 
 1 tph to 

During the peak hours and on weekends, the service between London Victoria and East Grinstead is increased to 2 tph.

On Sundays, northbound services on the Uckfield branch terminate at Oxted instead of London Bridge.

Bus services
The station is served by the following bus services, all operated by Southdown PSV:
 236 to Westerham, Edenbridge, Lingfield and East Grinstead (Monday-Friday Only)
 594/595 to Tatsfield and Westerham (Monday-Saturday Only)

These services stop adjacent to the London bound platform on Station Road East. Rail replacement services stop directly outside the main concourse of the station during periods of engineering work.

References

External links

Railway stations in Surrey
Former Croydon and Oxted Joint Railway stations
Railway stations in Great Britain opened in 1884
Railway stations served by Govia Thameslink Railway
Oxted